Lund is a Baloch tribe of Pakistan. It is Balochi word meaning "warrior" , " the Belooches belong to the caste of warriors". They are a sub tribe of the greater Rind Baloch Tribe. They originally came from Balochistan and are now settled in Sindh and Punjab. According to Baloch lore, their ancestors hail from Aleppo in what is now Syria. They claim to be descendants of Ameer Hamza, uncle of the prophet Muhammad, who settled in Halab (present-day Aleppo). After the fight against second Umayyad Caliph Yazid I at Karbala (in which Ameer Hamza's descendants supported and fought alongside Husayn ibn Ali) in 680, descendants of Ameer Hamza migrated to east or southeast of the central Caspian region, specially toward Sistan.

Ancestry and history 
It's widely believed that Baloch (similarly to all Baloch people)  are descendant of the Islamic Prophet Muhammad’s uncle, Ameer Hamza. After the fight against second Umayyad Caliph Yazid I at Karbala (in which Ameer Hamza’s descendants supported and fought alongside Husayn ibn Ali) in 680, descendants of Ameer Hamza went off to settle at the east or southeast of the central Caspian region, specially toward Sistan, Iran. It's also believed that baloch ancestors were distantly related to the Oghuz Turks, Seljuks. Because of the belief that Baloch people’s ancestral home was Aleppo, second largest city in modern day Syria, it's theorised that they possibly could also be very close to the Ayyubids and one point in history.

Languages People of this tribe speak Balochi, Saraiki, Sindhi and Arabic. 

Location Members of this tribe reside in province Sindh in Ghotki , Dadu and Hyderabad . Some are found in Balochistan and southern Punjab also. Their main inhabitants are near the mountains of Koh-e-sulaiman range in Shadan Lund ( Dera Ghazi Khan ), Tibbi Lundan ( Rajanpur) and in Sindh (Mainly Ghotki and Dadu ) and Balochistan. History they came at Dera Ghazi Khan and defeated Pathans at Salar near the mountain of Koh-e-Sulaiman.They originally came from Balochistan and are now settled in Punjab, around Dera Ghazi Khan and Sindh.

References 

Social groups of Pakistan
Baloch tribes